The 36th Directors Guild of America Awards, honoring the outstanding directorial achievements in film and television in 1983, were presented on March 10, 1984.

Winners and nominees

Film

Television

Commercials

D.W. Griffith Award
 Orson Welles

Robert B. Aldrich Service Award
 Robert Wise

References

External links
 

Directors Guild of America Awards
1983 film awards
1983 television awards
Direct
Direct
Directors
Directors Guild of America Awards